Kryeziu is an Albanian surname.
 Albulena Kryeziu (born 1986), Albanian actress
 Hekuran Kryeziu, Kosovan footballer
 Kryeziu Brothers (Ceno Bey, Gani Bey, Said Bey, Ali, Rada, and Hasan Bey), members of an influential Kosovo Albanian family in the 20th century
 Riza Kryeziu (1847–1917), better known as Riza Bey Gjakova, Albanian nationalist and guerrilla fighter

See also
Kryezezi, a tribe in the Mat District
Kryezi, Tirana
Kryezi, Kavajë
Kriezis, Greek surname of Arvanite origin

Albanian-language surnames